Jean-Jérôme Adam (8 June 1904 – 11 July 1981) was the French Roman Catholic archbishop of Libreville, Gabon, and an accomplished linguist who studied several of the languages of Gabon.

He was born at Wittenheim in Alsace and educated in the seminaries of the Holy Ghost Fathers. He arrived in Gabon on 29 September 1929, and spent the next 18 years as a missionary in the Haut-Ogooué Province.  During that time he prepared grammars for the Mbédé, Ndumu, and Duma languages.

In 1947, Adam was appointed Vicar Apostolic of Libreville and bishop of the titular see of Rhinocorura; he became bishop of Libreville when it was elevated to a diocese in 1955, and he was made archbishop of the see in 1958. He retired in 1969 and moved to Franceville, where he died in 1981.

References

 David E. Gardinier, Historical Dictionary of Gabon, 2nd ed. (The Scarecrow Press, 1994) p. 31

External links
 Catholic-hierarchy.org entry for J.-J. Adam

1904 births
1981 deaths
People from Haut-Rhin
People from Alsace-Lorraine
20th-century Roman Catholic archbishops in Africa
French Roman Catholic missionaries
Gabonese Roman Catholic archbishops
Participants in the Second Vatican Council
French emigrants to Gabon
Roman Catholic missionaries in Gabon
Holy Ghost Fathers
Missionary linguists
Roman Catholic bishops of Libreville
Roman Catholic archbishops of Libreville